Prince Alfred Louis of Liechtenstein (Alfred Aloys Eduard; 11 July 1842 in Prague – 8 October 1907 in Frauenthal castle) was the son of Prince Franz de Paula of Liechtenstein (1802–1887) and Countess Julia Eudoxia Potocka-Piława (1818–1895), older brother of Prince Louis of Liechtenstein, and cousin and brother-in-law of Franz I of Liechtenstein.

He was the 1,143rd Knight of the Order of the Golden Fleece in Austria in 1903.

Marriage and issue
On 26 April 1865, in Vienna, he married his first cousin Princess Henriette Maria Norberta (Schloss Liechtenstein bei Mödling, 6 June 1843 – Schloss Frauenthal, 24 December 1931), daughter of Aloys II, Prince of Liechtenstein. The couple had ten children together.
 Princess Franziska Maria Johanna (Vienna, 21 August 1866 – Schloss Frauenthal, 23 December 1939), unmarried and without issue
 Prince Franz de Paula Maria (Vienna, 24 January 1868 – Graz, 26 August 1929), unmarried and without issue
 Princess Julia (Vienna, 24 January 1868 – Vienna, 24 January 1868)
 Prince Aloys of Liechtenstein (1869–1955); married Archduchess Elisabeth Amalie of Austria; renounced his succession rights in favor of his son Franz Joseph II, Prince of Liechtenstein in 1923
 Princess Maria Theresia Julie (Hollenegg, 9 September 1871 – Schloss Frauenthal, 9 April 1964), unmarried and without issue
 Prince Johannes Franz Alfred Maria Caspar Melchior Balthasar (Vienna, 6 January 1873 – Hollenegg, 3 September 1959), 1,220th Knight of the Order of the Golden Fleece in 1921, married in Budapest on 6 September 1906 Marie Gräfin Andrássy von Czik-Szent-Király und Krasna-Horka (Budapest, 7 December 1886 – Vienna, 14 December 1961), and had issue
 Prince Alfred Roman (Vienna, 6 April 1875 – Waldstein bei Peggau, Styria, 25 October 1930), married in Munich on 19 February 1912 Theresia Maria Prinzessin zu Oettingen-Oettingen und Oettingen-Wallerstein (Munich, 1 June 1887 – Waldstein, 29 May 1971), and had issue
 Prince Heinrich Aloys Maria Joseph (Hollenegg, 21 June 1877 – k.i.a. in World War I in Warsaw, 16 August 1915), unmarried and without issue
 Prince Karl Aloys (Frauenthal, 16 September 1878 – Frauenthal, 20 June 1955), married civilly in Stuttgart on 31 March 1921 and religiously in Tegernsee on 5 April 1921 Elisabeth Prinzessin von Urach Gräfin von Württemberg Princess of Lithuania (Schloss Lichtenstein, 23 August 1894 – Frauenthal, 13 October 1962), daughter of Mindaugas II of Lithuania and first wife Duchess Amalie in Bayern, and had issue.
 Prince Georg Hartmann Joseph Maria Mathäus (Pater Ildefons, O.S.B.) (Vienna, 22 February 1880 – Hollenegg, 14 April 1931), a Benedictine Monk in Prague

Ancestry

External links

References

s

1842 births
1907 deaths
Princes of Liechtenstein
Liechtenstein people of Polish descent
Nobility from Prague
Knights of the Golden Fleece of Austria